The 1897–98 season was Manchester City F.C.'s seventh season of league football and sixth season in the Football League.

Team Kit

Football League Second Division

Results summary

Reports

FA Cup

Squad statistics

Squad
Appearances for competitive matches only

Scorers

All

League

FA Cup

See also
Manchester City F.C. seasons

References

External links
Extensive Manchester City statistics site

1897-98
English football clubs 1897–98 season